The Klopsteg Memorial Award is an annual prize given to a notable physicist in memory of Paul E. Klopsteg. Established in 1990, it is awarded by the American Association of Physics Teachers.

The Klopsteg Memorial Award recipient is asked to make a major presentation at an AAPT Summer Meeting on a topic of current significance suitable for non-specialists.

Award Winners

See also

 List of physics awards
 List of prizes named after people

References 

Physics awards
Awards established in 1991
American awards